The 1909 British Columbia general election was the twelfth general election for the Province of British Columbia, Canada. It was held to elect members of the Legislative Assembly of British Columbia. The election was called on October 20, 1909, and held on November 25, 1909. The new legislature met for the first time on January 20, 1910.

The governing Conservative Party won its third consecutive term in government with over half of the popular vote and all but four of the 42 seats in the legislature, effectively a rout for the popular incumbent Premier, Sir Richard McBride.

Despite winning almost one-third of the popular vote, the Liberal Party won only two seats, the same number won by the Socialist Party with only 11.5% of the vote.

The first-past-the-post allocation of seats, combined with the multi-member constituencies in effect at the time, ensured that the Conservatives won with a lead of 34 seats, instead of only a lead of two seats that its proportion of the popular vote should have granted it.

Results

Notes:

* Party did not nominate candidates in the previous election.

1 Two candidates are counted twice: R. McBride (Conservative), who contested and was elected in both Victoria City and Yale, and J. Oliver (Liberal) who contested but was defeated in both Delta and Victoria City.

2 Organized in 1906. Not the same as the CLP that contested the 1924 election.

Results by riding

|-
||    
|align="center"  |Henry Esson Young
|align="center"  |AtlinConservative
||    
||    
|align="center"  |AlberniLiberal
|align="center"|Harlan Carey Brewster
||    
|-
||    
|align="center"|Michael Callanan
|align="center" rowspan=2 |CaribooConservative
||    
||    
|align="center"  |EsquimaltLiberal
|align="center"|John Jardine
||    
|-
||    
|align="center"|John Anderson Fraser
||    
||    
|align="center"  |Nanaimo CitySocialist
|align="center"|James Hurst Hawthornthwaite
||    
|-
||    
|align="center"|Samuel Arthur Cawley
|align="center"  |ChilliwhackConservative
||    
||    
|align="center"  |NewcastleSocialist
|align="center"|Parker Williams
||    
|-
|-
||    
|align="center"|Henry George Parson
|align="center"  |ColumbiaConservative
||    
|-
|-
||    
|align="center"|Michael Manson
|align="center"  |ComoxConservative
||    
|-
|-
||    
|align="center"|William Henry Hayward
|align="center"  |CowichanConservative
||    
|-
|-
||    
|align="center"|Thomas Donald Caven 
|align="center"  |CranbrookConservative
||    
|-
|-
||    
|align="center"|Francis James Anderson MacKenzie 
|align="center"  |DeltaConservative
||    
|-
|-
||    
|align="center"|William J. Manson
|align="center"  |DewdneyConservative
||    
|-
|-
||    
|align="center"|William Roderick Ross
|align="center"  |FernieConservative
||    
|-
|-
||    
|align="center"|Ernest Miller
|align="center"  |Grand ForksConservative
||    
|-
|-
||    
|align="center"|John Robert Jackson
|align="center"  |GreenwoodConservative
||    
|-
||    
|align="center"|Albert Edward McPhillips
|align="center"  |The IslandsConservative
||    
|-
|-
||    
|align="center"|James Pearson Shaw
|align="center"  |KamloopsConservative
||    
|-
|-
||    
|align="center"|Neil Franklin MacKay
|align="center"  |KasloConservative
||    
|-
|-
||    
|align="center"|Archibald McDonald
|align="center"  |LillooetConservative
||    
|-
|-
||    
|align="center"|Harry Wright
|align="center"  |Nelson CityConservative
||    
|-
|-
||    
|align="center"|Thomas Gifford
|align="center"  |New Westminster CityConservative
||    
|-
|-
||    
|align="center"|Price Ellison
|align="center"  |OkanaganConservative
||    
|-
|-
||    
|align="center"|Thomas Taylor
|align="center"  |RevelstokeConservative
||    
|-
|-
||    
|align="center"|Francis Lovett Carter-Cotton
|align="center"  |RichmondConservative
||    
|-
|-
||    
|align="center"|William Robert Braden
|align="center"  |Rossland CityConservative
||    
|-
|-
||    
|align="center"|David McEwen Eberts
|align="center"  |SaanichConservative
||    
|-
|-
||    
|align="center"|Lytton Wilmot Shatford
|align="center"  |SimilkameenConservative
||    
|-
|-
||    
|align="center"|William Manson
|align="center"  |SkeenaConservative
||    
|-
|-
||    
|align="center"|William Hunter
|align="center"  |SlocanConservative
||    
|-
|-
||    
|align="center"|William John Bowser
|align="center" rowspan=5 |Vancouver CityConservative
||    
|-
|-
||    
|align="center"|Alexander Henry Boswell MacGowan
||    
|-
||    
|align="center"|George Albert McGuire
||    
|-
|-
||    
|align="center"|Charles Edward Tisdall
||    
|-
|-
||    
|align="center"|Henry Holgate Watson
||    
|-
|-
||    
|align="center"|Henry Frederick William Behnsen
|align="center" rowspan=4 |Victoria CityConservative
||    
|-
|-
||    
|align="center"|Frederick Davey
||    
|-
|-
||    
|align="center"|Richard McBride 1Premier
||    
|-
|-
||    
|align="center"|Henry Broughton Thomson
||    
|-
|-
||    
|align="center"|Richard McBridePremier1
|align="center"  |YaleConservative
||    
|-
|-
||    
|align="center"|James Hargrave Schofield
|align="center"  |YmirConservative
||    
|-
|
|align-left"|1 Elected simultaneously in Yale and Victoria City.
|
|
|
|
|
|-
| align="center" colspan="10"|Source: Elections BC
|-
|}

Notes

See also
List of British Columbia political parties

Further reading & references

In the Sea of Sterile Mountains: The Chinese in British Columbia, Joseph Morton, J.J. Douglas, Vancouver (1974).  Despite its title, a fairly thorough account of the politicians and electoral politics in early BC.

References

1909
1909 elections in Canada
1909 in British Columbia
November 1909 events